Ulex densus (Portuguese: tojo-gatunho or tojo-da-charneca) is an evergreen shrub in the family Fabaceae endemic to Portugal.

Description
It is densely ramified and forms a compact, closed pillow with dry brown stems and a bright green outside. Fruits are as large as the plant's calyx and have 1-2 seeds.

Distribution and habitat
Ulex densus grows in the central-west coast of Portugal, mainly on the Lisbon District, southern Leiria District and in the Arrábida Natural Park. It lives in woods and cliffs along the coast, but also Quercus forests (Quercus rotundifolia and Quercus suber) more inland, from sea level to  altitude and prefers limestone substrates.

Threats
It is mainly threatened by quarries, urbanisation, industrial or commercial areas, communication networks, trampling, overuse and natural fires.

References

densus
Endemic flora of Portugal
Flora of Portugal
Endemic flora of the Iberian Peninsula